Spyros Pinas (14 July 1973 – 17 March 2009) was a Greek luger. He competed at the 1994 Winter Olympics and the 1998 Winter Olympics.

References

External links
 

1973 births
2009 deaths
Greek male lugers
Olympic lugers of Greece
Lugers at the 1994 Winter Olympics
Lugers at the 1998 Winter Olympics
Place of birth missing
Sportspeople from Minneapolis